Alfredo Ormando (15 December 1958 in San Cataldo – 23 January 1998 in Rome) was a gay writer from Palermo who died as a result of setting himself on fire outside Saint Peter's Basilica. His self-immolation was an act of protest against the Roman Catholic Church's teaching on homosexuality.

Ormando's only published book was the novel Il Fratacchione ("The Overweight Monk"), which recounted his two years at a monastery attempting to get closer to God and to purify himself of unclean desires. The narrator in the book states, "It isn't true that gay is beautiful. On the contrary, it is a continual death on the inside. Either you accept being gay, or you kill yourself."

On 13 January 1998, Ormando set himself on fire in St. Peter's Square close to where Pope John Paul II was addressing the crowds. Two policemen tried to extinguish the flames, and he was taken to Sant'Eugenio Hospital with third-degree burns over 90 percent of his body. He died 10 days later. Ormando was 39 years old. In a letter to a friend he wrote: "I hope they will understand the message I want to give - it is a form of protest against a Church that demonises homosexuality, demonising nature at the same time; despite the fact that homosexuality is a child of nature".

, Ormando's actions are commemorated annually in St Peter's Square by LGBT rights activists.

In 2014, the filmmaker Andy Abrahams Wilson, produced a 40-minute documentary film called Alfredo's Fire for the San Francisco-based Open Eye Pictures. Wilson argued that, "Fire was the perfect allegory for the experiences of LGBT people. Fire is at once a self-annihilation, and harkens back to the Middle Ages when homosexuals were burned at the stake". He said that church authorities downplayed the event, arguing that Ormando was psychologically disturbed, had family problems and had not been making a protest against the Church.

See also
 Catholic Church and homosexuality
 Dissent from Catholic teaching on homosexuality
 List of political self-immolations

References

External links
 Alfredo's Fire is a documentary by Open Eye Pictures about Ormando's death.
 Soulforce Alert, January 3, 2001

1958 births
1998 deaths
People from San Cataldo, Sicily
Suicides by self-immolation
Italian gay writers
Suicides in Vatican City
LGBT and Catholicism
Italian LGBT rights activists
LGBT-related suicides
Critics of the Catholic Church
LGBT history in Italy
1998 suicides
20th-century LGBT people